KC Rules OK is a studio album by Scottish singer-songwriter King Creosote, released on 19 September 2005 on Names. A subsequent remastered special edition version of the album was released in 2006 with a new track, "So Forlorn", re-recordings of "678" and "Marguerita Red" and liner notes by author Ian Rankin.

The album's liner notes state that the songs featured on the album were written between 1988-2003. The Earlies perform as Creosote's backing band on this album.

Accolades
In December 2009, KC Rules OK ranked #6 in The Skinny's "Scottish Albums of the Decade" poll. Upon receiving the accolade, Anderson stated, "For me KC Rules OK was basically the first chance I got to do a proper album as King Creosote. I'm very proud of the titles I've put out through Fence but anyone can put their own music out on their own label. Yes, there are a few things you need to do to get there, but you are your own yardstick for quality. [...] At the time it felt like a bit of daunting step. It was basically me going into a studio with my chords and my words and saying to somebody else: "What would you do with that?" But The Earlies were great. They weren't precious and didn't tiptoe around me."

This album was recommended in the October 2007 issue of Q as recommended further listening for KT Tunstall's Drastic Fantastic.

Track listing
"Not One Bit Ashamed" – 5:01
"You Are, Could I?" – 3:53
"The Vice-Like Gist of It" – 2:58
"Bootprints" – 3:49
"Locked Together" – 4:45
"Jump at the Cats" – 2:33
"Guess the Time" – 1:06
"Favourite Girl" – 5:35
"I'll Fly by the Seat of My Pants" – 4:06
"678" – 6:16
"Marguerita Red" – 3:50

Personnel
The following people contributed to KC Rules OK:

Musicians
King Creosote - vocals, guitar, arrangements
The Earlies - various instruments
Christian Madden - arrangements

Recording personnel
Giles Hatton - producer
Tom Knott - producer, recording, mixing
Christian Madden - producer
Guy Davie - mastering

Artwork
Donkey 3 - illustrations
Deirdre O'Callahan - cover photograph

References

2005 albums
King Creosote albums